The 2003–04 Taça de Portugal was the 64th edition of the Portuguese football knockout tournament, organized by the Portuguese Football Federation (FPF). This edition of the Taça de Portugal began on 7 September 2003, and concluded on 16 May 2004 with the final at the Estádio Nacional.

Porto were the previous holders, having defeated União de Leiria 1–0 in the previous season's final. Benfica defeated Porto, 2–1 in the final to win their twenty fourth Taça de Portugal, dedicated to Miklós Fehér. Benfica's cup success would gain them qualification to the 2004 Supertaça Cândido de Oliveira.

Format and schedule

1.  One hundred and sixteen of the one hundred and eighteen teams competing in the 2003–04 Terceira Divisão, played in this round. Benfica B were unable to compete in the domestic cup competition due to the possibility of encountering their senior side in the competition. Queluz also did not participate.
2.  Fifty four of the fifty nine teams competing in the 2003–04 Segunda Divisão, played in this round. Académica de Coimbra B, Braga B, Marítimo B, Porto B and Sporting CP B were unable to compete in the domestic cup competition due to the possibility of encountering their senior side in the competition. Queluz also did not participate.

Teams

Primeira Liga

 Académica de Coimbra
 Alverca
 Beira-Mar
 Belenenses
 Benfica
 Boavista
 Braga
 Estrela da Amadora
 Gil Vicente

 Marítimo
 Moreirense
 Nacional
 Paços de Ferreira
 Porto
 Rio Ave
 Sporting CP
 União de Leiria
 Vitória de Guimarães

Liga de Honra

 Chaves
 Desportivo das Aves
 Estoril
 Feirense
 Felgueiras
 Leixões
 Maia
 Marco
 Naval
 Ovarense

 Penafiel
 Portimonense
 Rabo de Peixe
 Salgueiros
 Santa Clara
 Sporting da Covilhã
 União da Madeira
 Varzim
 Vitória de Setúbal

Second Division
North Zone

 Bragança
 Caçadores das Taipas
 Dragões Sandinenses
 Ermesinde
 Fafe
 Freamunde
 Gondomar
 Infesta
 Leça

 Lixa
 Lousada
 Paredes
 Pedras Rubras
 Trofense
 Valdevez
 Vilanovense
 Vizela

Central Zone

 Académico de Viseu
 Águeda
 Alcains
 Caldas
 Esmoriz
 Estarreja
 Fátima
 Marinhense
 Oliveira do Bairro
 Oliveira do Hospital

 Oliveirense
 Pampilhosa
 Portomosense
 Sanjoanense
 Sporting de Espinho
 Sporting de Pombal
 Torreense
 União de Lamas
 Vilafranquense

South Zone

 Amora
 Barreirense
 Camacha
 Estrela Vendas Novas
 Farense
 Louletano
 Lusitânia
 Mafra
 Odivelas

 Olhanense
 Olivais e Moscavide
 Oriental
 Pinhalnovense
 Pontassolense
 Ribeira Brava
 Santo António
 Sintrense
 União Micaelense

Third Division
Série A

 Amares
 Cabeceirense
 Cerveira
 Esposende
 Joane
 Juventude de Ronfe
 Maria da Fonte
 Mirandela
 Monção

 Montalegre
 Os Sandinenses
 Ponte da Barca
 Rebordelo
 Santa Maria
 Valenciano
 Valpaços
 Vianense
 Vilaverdense

Série B

 AD Oliveirense
 Aliados Lordelo
 Canelas
 Cinfães
 Famalicão
 Fiães
 Lourosa
 Nogueirense
 Paços de Brandão

 Pedrouços
 Rebordosa
 Régua
 Ribeirão
 Rio Tinto
 São Pedro da Cova
 Tirsense
 Torre de Moncorvo
 Vila Real

Série C

 Aguiar da Beira
 Anadia
 Arouca
 Arrifanense
 Cesarense
 Fornos de Algodres
 Gafanha
 Mangualde
 Milheiroense

 Penalva do Castelo
 Santacombadense
 São João de Ver
 Sátão
 Social Lamas
 Tocha
 Tourizense
 União de Coimbra
 Valecambrense

Série D

 Abrantes
 Alcobaça
 Alqueidão da Serra
 Atlético Riachense
 Benfica Castelo Branco
 Beneditense
 Bidoeirense
 Caranguejeira
 Fazendense

 Idanhense
 Lourinhanense
 Mirense
 Peniche
 Rio Maior
 Sertanense
 Sourense
 Torres Novas
 União de Almeirim

Série E

 1º de Dezembro
 Alcochetense
 Benavilense
 Câmara de Lobos
 Carregado
 Casa Pia
 Loures
 Machico

 Malveira
 Montijo
 O Elvas
 Portosantense
 Sacavenense
 Santacruzense
 Santana
 Vialonga

Série F

 Almancilense
 Atlético CP
 Beira-Mar de Monte Gordo
 Desportivo de Beja
 Esperança de Lagos
 Fabril Barreiro
 Imortal
 Juventude de Évora
 Lusitano VRSA

 Messinense
 Monte Trigo
 Moura
 Quarteirense
 Seixal
 Sesimbra
 Silves
 União Santiago
 Vasco da Gama AC

Série Azores

 Angrense
 Barreiro
 Boavista Flores
 Madalena
 Mira Mar

 Operário
 Praiense
 Santiago
 Sporting de Ideal
 Velense

District Leagues

 Águias de Alpiarça
 Águias do Moradal
 Atei
 Avintes
 Bombarralense
 CF Vasco da Gama
 Eléctrico
 Estrela da Calheta
 Fayal
 Ginásio Figueirense

 Lagoa
 Macedo de Cavaleiros
 Moitense
 Neves
 Os Leões
 Paivense
 Penelense
 UD Valonguense
 União de Montemor
 União Torcatense

First round
For the first round draw, teams were drawn against each other in accordance to their geographical location. The draw was split up into four sections: teams from the north, the center, the south and the Azores region. All first round cup ties were played on the 7 September. Due to the odd number of teams at this stage of the competition, Rabo de Peixe progressed to the next round due to having no opponent to face at this stage of the competition. The first round of the cup saw teams from the Terceira Divisão (IV) start the competition alongside some teams who registered to participate in the cup from the Portuguese District Leagues (V).

North Zone

Central Zone

South Zone

Azores Zone

Second round
For the second round draw, teams were drawn against each other in accordance to their geographical location. The draw was split up into three sections: teams from the north, the center and the south. Ties were played on the 28 September. The second round saw teams from the Portuguese Second Division (III) enter the competition.

North Zone

Central Zone

South Zone

Third round
The draw for the third round took place on the 2 October. Ties were played on the 11–12 October. The third round saw teams from the Liga de Honra (II) enter the competition.

Fourth round
All fourth round cup ties were played on the 22–23 November. The fourth round saw teams from the Primeira Liga (I) enter the competition.

Fifth round
Ties were played on the 17 December. Felgueiras won their fifth round cup tie against Vilafranquense, but their win was overturned and Vilafranquense progressed to the next round due to Felgueiras' coach appearing at the tie to manage his side when he was supposed to be suspended. Due to the odd number of teams involved at this stage of the competition, Braga qualified for the quarter-finals due to having no opponent to face at this stage of the competition.

Sixth round
Ties were played on the 14–21 January. Due to the odd number of teams involved at this stage of the competition, Benfica qualified for the quarter-finals due to having no opponent to face at this stage of the competition.

Quarter-finals
All quarter-final ties were played on the 11 February.

Semi-finals
Ties were played on the 16–17 March.

Final

References

Taça de Portugal seasons
Taca De Portugal, 2003-04
2003–04 domestic association football cups